Turri may refer to:

People
 Juan Adolfo Turri (1950–2010), Argentinian athlete
 Mirko Turri (born 1981), Italian bobsledder
 Mosè Turri (1837–1903), Italian painter
 Pellegrino Turri (1765–1828), Italian inventor

Places
 Turri, Sardinia, Italy